DWKV (102.3 FM), broadcasting as CitiBeat 102.3, is a radio station owned and operated by Kaissar Broadcasting Network. The station's studio and transmitter are located at JR Business Complex, Mataas na Lupa, Lipa, Batangas. Its transmitter antenna is heavily directional to eastern Batangas in order to protect the signal of Lemery-based Radyo Natin, broadcasting 25 KM southwest of Lipa.

The station has endured certain extents of notoriety due to unaddressed technical glitches and a string of failed promotional events that drew the ire of other stations in the market.

History
CityBeat first went on the air on December 22, 2010, months after the demise of Lipa's sole radio station DWDB 98.5. CitiBeat enjoyed the distinction of being the city's only full-power station until DZUN launched in November 2012. On its first months of operation, CitiBeat mounted with embattled criticism from other stations in the market due to the signal feed  spreading out to their frequencies within the city. By 2013, the problem has been resolved but the signal offset issues still persist near the station complex as its signals occupy 102.5 FM and 103.1 FM on some hotspots.

In March 2012, the station launched its first singing contest for radio, branded as Radyo Istariray, which featured aspiring singers who vied for prizes from station sponsors. However, by June 2012, sponsorship issues forced the station to stall the contest after its first mall show with the contestants' entries untouched by the station.

As of March 15, 2023, Radyo Natin Lemery was heard on this frequency in Lipa City, apparently while Citybeat's transmitter is currently temporarily not in operation.

News operation
CitiBeat formerly had a news operation called Mighty Patrol, launched in April 2011 with Zeus Corneja as lead studio anchor and a pool of reporters. It lasted until mid-2014 when the aforementioned technical issues and corporate problems prompted the news operation to disband, with only Corneja and Amor Santiago remaining on its flagship morning drive-time news program Balitambayan and Rolen Jubilo on a sit-in capacity. On April 15, 2019, the show was cut to a half-hour as the operation itself became syndicated with both personnel moving to 98.5 FM.

References

External links
CitiBeat FM FB Page

Radio stations in Batangas
Radio stations established in 2009